The IFP School (French: ENSPM - École Nationale Supérieure du Pétrole et des Moteurs) is a graduate engineering school located in Rueil-Malmaison, France. Founded in 1954, IFP School is part of the IFP Energies nouvelles (IFPEN), a French public-sector research and training center. The school graduates approximately 600 students per year in 20 graduate programs (10 in English), employing 40 regular professors and 350 instructors from industry.

History
While several institutions for oil and gas research and training existed in France since 1924, after the creation of IFP in 1944 these various institutions were folded into IFP and moved to the Rueil-Malmaison campus. The formal merger occurred in 1954, when by governmental decree the École Nationale Supérieure du Pétrole et des Moteurs (ENSPM) was formed and associated with the Fuels Department of the French Ministry of Ecology, Sustainable Development and Energy.

The school has evolved since its inception by creating the Center for Petroleum Economics (1963), expanding into graduate research degrees (1975), adding English language programs (1989), offering apprenticeship training (1996), and launching off-site degrees in critical energy regions around the world (2002).

Campus
IFP School is located on the IFP Energies Nouvelles site in Rueil-Malmaison, 12.6 km (7.8 mi) from the center of Paris. The campus consists of an administrative building, the academic building (containing classrooms, computer labs, offices, a library), a cafeteria, and a dormitory (132 apartments).

Off-site degree programs are also offered in Algeria, Nigeria, Malaysia, Russia and Venezuela, through partnerships with local universities and industrial sponsors.

Organization and administration
The Dean, Christine Travers, is responsible for the governance of the school. An advisory board, made up of leading names from the industry, alumni, research and higher education, provides assistance towards the overall direction of the school. Research and academics are divided into four centers, with Management and Administration considered a separate department. The centers are:

Exploration-Production
Refining, Petrochemicals, Gas
IC Engines and Hydrocarbon Utilizations
Economics and Management

Each center is staffed by a director, program coordinators, and academic staff.

Academics
IFP School primarily provides graduate training programs to both young engineers and industry professionals. Research masters and doctoral theses can be prepared in IFP's laboratories in all fields related to oil, gas, new energy technologies or engines. Approximately 50% of the student body is from outside France, and with 80% of students receiving scholarships or corporate sponsorship, IFP claims a 99% employment rate of graduating students.
Notable degrees, organized by center, include:

Center for Economics and Management
Petroleum Economics and Management
Sustainable Development, Environmental and Energy Economics
Energy and Environmental Policy and Economics
Energy and Markets

Center for Exploration-Production
Petroleum Geosciences, Geology or Geophysics
Reservoir Geoscience and Engineering
Petroleum Engineering and Project Development
Lithosphere, Basins, Oil

Center for IC Engines and Hydrocarbon Utilizations
Powertrain Engineering
Energy and Products
Energy and Powertrain
Electrification of Automotive Propulsion

Center for Refining, Petrochemicals, Gas
Processes and Polymers
Energy and Processes

In 2010, a team of five students from the IFP School "Petroleum Geosciences" program (made up of geologists and geophysicists of the 2010 class) won the Imperial Barrel Award, a worldwide competition sponsored by the American Association of Petroleum Geologists.

Boards

The school's advisory and steering boards include representatives from the industry, to ensure that the main priorities taken by the School are in keeping with industry's expectations and needs.

The advisory board examines and approves the school's main strategic priorities. It consists of the following members:

Representing industry

 Rémi Bastien, Deputy Director, Mechanical Engineering, Renault
 Guillaume Devauchelle, R&D Director, Valeo
 Philip Jordan, Recruitment Director, Total
 Philippe Marcus, Deputy Vice-President, Exploration-Production, Gaz de France
 Pedro Miro Roig, Technology Director, Cepsa
 Thierry Parmentier, Human Resources Director, Technip
 Olivier Perret, Vice-President, Senior Vice President, E&P (Deputy), GDF Suez
 Jean-Baptiste Renard, Vice-President, Europe, BP Group
 Arnd Wilhelms, Vice-President, Reservoir Geology and Geophysics, Statoil Hydro

Representing higher education and research

 Alain Bravo, Managing Director, Supelec
 Benjamin Calvo Pérez, Director of the Higher School of Mining Technologies of Madrid
 Bernard Leduc, Professor at the Université Libre of Brussels
 Alain Storck, Director of INSA (Institut national des sciences appliquées) of Lyon

Representing alumni

 Claude Chavanne, Responsible of Safety, Arkema
 Francis Duseux, Chairman and CEO, Esso SAF
 Isabelle Gaildraud, Human Resources Director, Total E&P
 Patrice Marez, Head of the Design, Systems, Powertrain and Transmission entity at PSA Peugeot Citroën

In addition, for each training program, IFP School is advised by a steering committee consisting of experts from the relevant industry, to decide on changes to be made to the program’s objectives and content and to the graduates' profiles.

Student life
Various activities outside of the classroom are organized at IFP School, centered around language courses, the Business Skills Center, and several Cultural and athletic associations. IFP's campus is a 30-minute commute from central Paris by RER A, so much of the student life is centered there.

Notable alumni 
 Olivier Bouygues, deputy CEO of Bouygues
 Pierre Gadonneix, French businessman, chairman of the board and CEO of EDF, 2004–2009
 François Perrodo, chairman of the board of Perenco
 Laurent Rossi, chief executive officer at Automobiles Alpine and Alpine F1 Team
 Macky Sall, President of Senegal
 Jon Samseth, specialist of energy issues, scientific advisor for publications of UNEP and member of the Norwegian Academy of Technological Sciences

References

External links
 

Engineering universities and colleges in France
Education in Paris
Grandes écoles